Tiny Evil Records is a record label imprint run by Interscope Records executive Luke Wood. Its acts include AFI, Jimmy Eat World, Brand New and Nine Black Alps, among others.

See also
 List of record labels

External links
Tiny Evil Records site

American record labels
Alternative rock record labels